"Un homme debout" is a song by French singer Claudio Capéo. The song was released as a digital download in France on 5 February 2016 by Jo & Co as the lead single from his third studio album Claudio Capéo. The song was written by Mamadou Niakaté, Ansley Ford, Jean-Pascal Anziani, Sylvain Hagopian and Ricardo Cessaut. The song peaked at number 6 on the French Singles Chart.

Music video
A video to accompany the release of "Un homme debout" was first released onto YouTube on 25 March 2016 at a total length of three minutes and twenty-one seconds. The video was directed by Hobo & Mojo.

Live performances
 Victoires de la Musique (10 February 2017)

Track listing

Charts

Release history

References

2016 singles
2016 songs